"I'll Always Be Right There" is an acoustic song written by Bryan Adams and Robert John "Mutt" Lange for Adams' seventh studio album 18 til I Die (1996). The song reached No. 14 in his native Canada. In the U.S., it reached No. 3 on the Adult Contemporary chart and No. 59 on the Hot 100 Airplay chart.

Charts

Weekly charts

Year-end charts

References

1996 songs
1997 singles
Bryan Adams songs
Songs written by Robert John "Mutt" Lange
Song recordings produced by Robert John "Mutt" Lange
Songs written by Bryan Adams
Canadian soft rock songs
A&M Records singles